Herminie Cadolle (1845–1926) was a French inventor of the modern bra and founder of the Cadolle Lingerie House. Cadolle was born, raised, and lived much of her early life in France. She was a close friend of the insurrectionist Louise Michel, who participated in the Paris Commune of 1871. Fearing state repression after the murderous defeat of the Commune uprising, Cadolle and her family fled for safety to Buenos Aires, Argentina. In 1887, Cadolle opened a shop selling made-to-measure underwear. In 1889, Cadolle returned to Paris where she opened a similar lingerie workshop. There, she invented a two-piece undergarment. The lower part was a hybrid-corset for the waist and the upper supported the breasts by means of shoulder straps. A patent for the invention was filed in 1889. Cadolle exhibited her invention at the Great Exposition of 1900 and by 1905 the upper half was being sold separately as modern-day bras.

Corsets had been briefly unpopular during the French Revolution of 1789, when they were associated with the aristocracy, but soon they returned to prominence as the political mood settled again. From the middle of the 19th century, gradually, the corset came under more and more criticism. Advocates for women’s rights, like Cadolle, and physicians highlighted its role in causing physical discomfort and health complications. Additionally, Cadolle continued to work into the 1920s. Her efforts were spurred by the First World War, which saw women enter the factories when male workers left for war. Comfort rather than beauty was crucial, so the corset was out and the bra was in. Cadolle’s innovation and different variations of it are still dominant in female undergarments, as is the desire for women’s rights and the rebellion against adherence to societal norms and the ideal image of a woman’s body.

Cadolle became a fitter of bras to queens, princesses, dancers, and actresses. Mata Hari was among her customers. She was also the first to use cloth incorporating rubber (elastic) thread. Cadolle’s business is still running today.

References 

1845 births
1926 deaths
19th-century French businesspeople
19th-century French inventors
Women inventors